Michael Christopher McDowell (born December 21, 1984) is an American professional stock car racing driver. He competes full-time in the NASCAR Cup Series, driving the No. 34 Ford Mustang for Front Row Motorsports. He has also raced in open-wheel and sports cars.

McDowell began his career in open-wheel cars, which included competing in Formula Renault and Champ Car, and in sports cars like the Rolex Sports Car Series and 24 Hours of Daytona. He moved to stock car racing in 2006 and his first Cup Series season came in 2008, the latter of which saw him attract attention for a violent qualifying crash at Texas Motor Speedway. However, after losing his ride at Michael Waltrip Racing, much of McDowell's Cup career in the following years was with smaller teams, oftentimes as a start and park driver. McDowell did not run full-time in the Cup Series again until 2017 with Leavine Family Racing when he ran all 36 races. McDowell joined his current employer Front Row in 2018 and has raced full-time for the team ever since. He won the 2021 Daytona 500 with FRM, McDowell's first-ever win in the Cup Series. He also has a win in the NASCAR Xfinity Series in 2016.

Early career
McDowell started his career at the age of three racing BMX bicycles.  He would always win his division because there were not any other three- or four-year-olds to compete against.  At the start of each race, someone would have to hold him in the starting gate because his feet did not reach the ground.  Then, when McDowell was eight years old, he moved to karting with help from his mother Tracy, his father Bill, and his older brother Billy, who were all avid race fans. After ten years in karts, he would win not only the World Karting Association championship, but he would also take back to back undefeated International Kart Federation championships, along with 18 consecutive feature wins.

Open wheel
From karts, McDowell moved into Formula Renault with World Speed Motorsports in 2002 and won the Infineon Raceway, Las Vegas, and Firebird International Raceway events in his rookies season. Moving up the ladder, McDowell would move to the Star Mazda Series in 2003. He took victories at Sebring and Road America en route to a runner-up finish in the points. McDowell won seven races in 2004 en route to winning the series championship. McDowell would be picked up by Champ Car team Rocketsports for Surfer's Paradise and Mexico City, but decided to move on in 2005 to the Grand-Am Cup Series.

Grand-Am
During his run for the Star Mazda Championship, McDowell met businessman Rob Finlay at the Bob Bondurant School of High Performance Driving, where McDowell was an instructor. McDowell and Finlay soon established a partnership, and McDowell would drive his first sports car, a Porsche 996 in the Grand-Am Cup Series for Finlay Motorsports. In 2005, McDowell would stay at Finlay, but moved up to the Rolex Sports Car Series, joining veteran Memo Gidley in a BMW powered Riley sponsored by the Make A Wish Foundation. Together, they finished sixth in the overall points and took the team's first victory at Mexico City. McDowell made history by becoming the youngest driver to stand on the podium for a Grand-Am race at Barber Motorsports Park, and became the first driver since Mario Andretti to compete in both an open-wheel race and a sports car race in the same weekend. McDowell would also drive the team's No. 60 BMW M3 in the Grand-Am Cup series to a podium finish at Daytona International Speedway. McDowell would stick with Finlay for 2006 and was again partnered with Gidley. The duo would improve to fourth in points despite being winless. McDowell also drove a No. 15 Ford Mustang with owner Finlay, driving the car to a win at Barber Motorsports Park. He would cap off his Grand-Am year with a second-place finish at Miller Motorsports Park.

McDowell returned to the series for the 2012 24 Hours of Daytona, driving for Michael Shank Racing with drivers Jorge Goncalvez, Felipe Nasr, and Gastavo Yacamán. The four drivers would end up finishing third.

ARCA
ARCA RE/MAX Series owner Eddie Sharp  put McDowell behind the wheel of his No. 2 Dodge for five races of the 2006 season, starting with the Governor's Cup 200 at the Milwaukee Mile, where he scored a 34th-place finish. McDowell finished in sixth place at Salem, fifth at Talladega, and fourth at Iowa. McDowell returned to ESR to run the full schedule for Rookie of the Year honors in 2007. McDowell was involved in controversy at Toledo Speedway when his ESR teammate, Ken Butler III spun him late in the race. Butler would take his first win while McDowell would rally for a top ten finish. McDowell got his first stock car win at Kentucky Speedway. He followed that up with wins at Pocono, Chicagoland, and the season finale at Toledo. Although McDowell was in contention for the ARCA Re/Max Series championship all season, he was unable to pose a serious threat to Frank Kimmel for Kimmel's ninth championship. McDowell scored a second-place finish in the points along with Rookie of the Year honors, as well as scoring nine pole positions during the season. As McDowell moved to NASCAR, his ESR ride was taken over by former Formula One driver Scott Speed.

NASCAR

2007–2008
McDowell made his NASCAR debut in the Craftsman Truck Series. Driving the No. 17 for Darrell Waltrip Motorsports, McDowell qualified 29th and finish 30th after a late wreck. McDowell moved to the Busch Series as a developmental driver for Nextel Cup Series team Michael Waltrip Racing. Driving the No. 00 Toyota, McDowell drove at Texas, Phoenix, and Homestead, finishing respectively 20th, 14th, and 32nd.

McDowell was chosen to drive the No. 00 Cup Series car in 2008 after Dale Jarrett's retirement; David Reutimann replaced Jarrett in the No. 44 UPS-sponsored car. McDowell started 34th and finished 26th in his Sprint Cup debut, the Goody's Cool Orange 500, after a flat tire near the end of the race. After the race, he was criticized by veteran driver Jeff Burton for having blocked Burton's way to leader Denny Hamlin near the end of the race (McDowell was racing for the Lucky Dog free pass, which Burton did not realize at the time of his comments). In early August 2008, McDowell was pulled from the No. 00 Toyota Camry Sprint Cup car in favor of veteran NASCAR driver Mike Skinner for three races. Skinner helped evaluate the team's progress, while trying to get the No. 00 into the Top 35 in owner points, though McDowell returned to the ride at Richmond on September 6, 2008. McDowell was again pulled from the No. 00 Toyota Camry when he failed to qualify for the Camping World RV 400 at Kansas on September 28. McDowell's contract was not renewed by MWR for 2009 when Michael Waltrip decided not to retire and the team did not have a sponsorship for another car.

Crash at Texas Motor Speedway

While performing a qualifying attempt for the 2008 Samsung 500 at Texas Motor Speedway on April 4, 2008, McDowell had an accident that was strikingly similar to that of another racer with a road-racing background; Gordon Smiley (who died in a crash during Indianapolis 500 time trials in 1982). The car spun around once while tipping onto its roof, and then barrel-rolled eight times with fire coming out of the engine compartment, shedding debris in all directions, until coming to a stop back onto its tires. A large, dark impact mark was seen on the SAFER barrier, which showed how hard the car hit the barrier, which had to be repaired (the barrier moved inward when the car hit it), and as a result, qualifying for the race was delayed by an hour. The safety features of the barrier, the HANS device and the Car of Tomorrow racecar protected him. Because of this, he walked away from the crash without injury, and waved to the stunned crowd. Since his old car was destroyed, he had to switch to a backup car, and ended up starting at the rear of the field in the race.

2009

In 2009, McDowell drove a part-time schedule for JTG Daugherty Racing in the NASCAR Nationwide Series. On February 25, 2009, McDowell's first child, Trace Christopher, was born, named after Michael's late mother, Tracy. The baby boy was 7 pounds, 7 ounces, and born at 7:00 a.m. McDowell next attempted the April 2009 race at Talladega for Prism Motorsports in the Sprint Cup Series, as a regular driver Dave Blaney had a family obligation. After JTG Daugherty Racing ran out of sponsorship support after the second race at Daytona International Speedway, it was announced that he would drive the next two races for MacDonald Motorsports. He also competed in several races with Tommy Baldwin Racing in the No. 36 Toyota Camry. McDowell remained in the top 10 for most of the season. McDowell also competed in the Camping World Truck Series in 2009 for ThorSport Motorsports driving the No. 98 Chevy Silverado.

2010–2011
In 2010, McDowell started the season for Prism Motorsports. He drove the No. 55 car, then moved to the No. 46 team of Whitney Motorsports. In 2011, McDowell drove the No. 66 Toyota for HP Racing in the Sprint Cup Series. JGR also added the Bucyrus 200 at Road America to McDowell's schedule, leaving open the possibility of more races added. McDowell also drove one race for Joe Gibbs Racing in the Sprint Cup Series at Texas after NASCAR parked Kyle Busch following his actions at a Truck Series event.

2012–2013

In 2012, McDowell ran the Joe Gibbs Racing No. 18 Nationwide Series car in select races, and competed in the Sprint Cup Series for Phil Parsons Racing (formerly HP Racing) full-time; the team secured full sponsorship for the first five races of the season. It formed a partnership with Whitney Motorsports and Mike Curb to field McDowell's car, which carried the No. 98.

In the 2013 Daytona 500, McDowell recorded a then-career high 9th-place finish. Later in the season in the Nationwide Series, McDowell won the pole for the inaugural Nationwide Children's Hospital 200 at Mid-Ohio. McDowell finished 2nd behind A. J. Allmendinger.

2014
In October 2013, it was announced that McDowell would be moving to Leavine Family Racing's No. 95 Ford for the 2014 NASCAR Sprint Cup Series season. McDowell failed to qualify for the 2014 Daytona 500. McDowell had a Sprint Cup career-best seventh-place finish in the Coke Zero 400.

In the Cheez-It 355 at The Glen, on lap 64, Greg Biffle came up on Ryan Newman's front bumper, turning him into the outside retaining wall. His car ricocheted off the wall into McDowell's path where Newman barley clipped McDowell in the right rear of his car, and with the force of the impact, the rear end housing was snapped, causing him to get airborne. The car bounced twice in the air before it hit the wall. His housing was forced into the wall. The race was red-flagged, though both drivers were unharmed.

2015–2016

McDowell returned to the LFR No. 95 car for a 20-race schedule in 2015. The team merged with Circle Sport in 2016 and switched to Chevrolet, with McDowell splitting the schedule with Ty Dillon with sponsorship from Thrivent Financial, Cheerios, and WRL Contractors among others. The season started with McDowell placing 15th in the 2016 Daytona 500, a best for LFR in the Great American Race. McDowell was able to get a 10th-place finish in the 2016 Coke Zero 400, his best finish of the season so far. At the end of the season at Homestead, McDowell drove the No. 59 Chevrolet after CSLFR purchased a charter from the closing Tommy Baldwin Racing. McDowell ran decent all night and towards the end, he was able to avoid the big wreck involving Championship contender Carl Edwards and was able to get a 10th-place finish, his first non restrictor plate top 10 finish.

McDowell drove for Richard Childress Racing in the No. 2 Rheem Chevrolet in a one-race deal at Road America which got McDowell his first NASCAR victory. McDowell led the final 24 laps en route to the win.

2017

McDowell returned to Leavine Family Racing's No. 95 Chevrolet in 2017.  He started the season with a 15th-place finish in the Daytona 500. At Kansas, McDowell scored a season-best 13th-place finish. At Dover, McDowell scored his third straight top-20 finish, a career first, when he finished 19th upon avoiding a last-lap crash. At Daytona for the Coke Zero 400, McDowell spent most of the race towards the front and competed late for the win, as he was in second place on the last lap before ending the race with a career-best 4th-place finish, his first career top-five finish. It was also the best finishing result for Leavine Family Racing as a team.

McDowell completed 99 percent of the laps in 2017, the most among any full-time driver in the Cup Series that season, and finished a career-best 26th in the standings. It would be his final season with LFR.

2018
On September 19, 2017, Leavine announced Kasey Kahne would be replacing McDowell in the No. 95 car for the 2018 season. On November 24, 2017, Front Row Motorsports announced that McDowell would drive their No. 34 car full-time in 2018, replacing Landon Cassill. In the first race of the season, McDowell raced up front late and finished 9th in the 2018 Daytona 500, his fifth straight top-15 finish at Daytona (and third top ten in the last four races at the track) and tied his career-best finish in the race. McDowell would have a strong run in the 2018 Coke Zero Sugar 400 leading 20 laps, a career-best, and would finish second in stage 2 behind Ricky Stenhouse Jr. Unfortunately with 7 laps to go McDowell would crash out of the race and finish 26th. McDowell would later tie his best finish in the cup series points standings of 26th after leading laps at his final race of the season in Homestead.

2019

In 2019, McDowell returned to the No. 34 car for Front Row Motorsports. McDowell's longtime sponsor K-Love took a year-long break from being a primary sponsor of his car. In the 2019 Daytona 500, the first race of the season, he qualified in 34th and finished in 5th, which would become his career-best finish in the Daytona 500 as well as his second-best finish in a Cup Series race. After the race, 2018 champion Joey Logano confronted McDowell for not helping him win the Daytona 500, in which McDowell stated, "My team doesn't pay me to push you." During qualifying for the 2019 TicketGuardian 500 at ISM Raceway, McDowell had an on-track incident with Daniel Suárez, which resulted in a fight on pit road.

Two days before the 2019 Bank of America Roval 400 at Charlotte Motor Speedway, McDowell was rushed to the hospital after complaining of abdominal failure. He was cleared to race after passing kidney stones during the examination. McDowell would go on to run up front in the 1000bulbs.com 500 at Talladega Superspeedway, and even had a chance to win the race being in third place on the final lap of the race, and would finish 5th, capturing his second top 5 of 2019, the first time he would have multiple top 5s in a single cup series season in his career.

2020
On December 12, 2019, Front Row Motorsports announced that McDowell would return to the No. 34 for the 2020 season. McDowell started the year off with a 14th-place finish in the 2020 Daytona 500, his fifth consecutive top 15 in the Daytona 500 and his 8th top 15 in his last 9 Daytona races. McDowell would go on to qualify 3rd for the second Charlotte race due to the random draw and McDowell has boomed onto the scene since coming off of NASCAR's break. McDowell would capture an 8th-place finish at Pocono and following a DNF, a 7th-place finish at Indianapolis, marking the first time in his career he earned two top 10s two weeks in a row. McDowell would set a career-best for most top 15s in a season in just 16 races with 6 and has finished higher than his qualifying efforts 15 of his 20 starts. In his first 20 starts, McDowell had more lead lap finishes than the likes of Kyle Busch, Erik Jones, Jimmie Johnson, William Byron, Alex Bowman, and Ryan Blaney, finishing on the lead lap 15 of the first 20 races that season. During the All-Star Open at Bristol Motor Speedway, McDowell would win the pole and run up front most of the day before an on-track incident with driver Bubba Wallace which led to an angry interview from Wallace, as well as leaving the front bumper of his car by McDowell's garage. McDowell and Wallace later set aside their differences and along with McDowell's sponsor carparts.com, used the front bumper to raise over $34,000 for multiple charities including Victory Junction, and eventually gave away the front bumper to a fan. McDowell would capture his first top 10 finish on a road course in his career at the Daytona road course and would earn his new best career points standings finish in the cup series in 23rd. It was announced a month before the 2021 season started that McDowell had signed a one-year contract extension with FRM to return to the 34 for the following season.

2021: First Playoff Appearance And Daytona 500 Win

McDowell remained in FRM's No. 34 for a fourth year in 2021. He won the season-opening Daytona 500 after avoiding a crash involving the leaders Joey Logano and Brad Keselowski on the final lap. Before his big victory, McDowell had one of the longest streaks of races before his first win; it was his first career win in his 358th career start, second only to Michael Waltrip, whose first win came in his 463rd start. He would go on to finish the first 3 races of the season inside the top 10. McDowell also nearly won at Talladega in the spring, finishing a close third behind Keselowski and Byron. McDowell would follow this performance by a strong 7th-place finish at the inaugural cup series race at Circuit of the Americas after early contact with Martin Truex Jr. McDowell's win at Daytona locked him into the All-Star Race and the NASCAR playoffs for the first time in his 14-year cup series career. McDowell was eliminated from the playoffs following the conclusion of the Round of 16 at Bristol. He finished the season with one win, two top-fives, five top-tens, an average finish of 20.5, and finished 16th in the points standings.

2022

McDowell started the 2022 season with a seventh place finish at the 2022 Daytona 500. He scored seven top-10 finishes during the regular season. On July 26, crew chief Blake Harris was suspended for four races and fined 100,000 for an L2 Penalty during post-race inspection after the 2022 M&M's Fan Appreciation 400 at Pocono. The penalty came under Sections 14.1 C, D and Q and 14.5 A and B in the NASCAR Rule Book, both of which pertain to the body and overall vehicle assembly rules surrounding modification of a single-source supplied part. In addition, the No. 34 team was docked 100 driver and owner points and 10 playoff points.

Personal life
McDowell is married to Jami and they have five children, Trace, Emma, Rylie, Lucas and Isabella. McDowell is a Christian.

McDowell and Justin Marks currently own a karting facility called the GoPro Motorplex, located 30 miles north of Charlotte, North Carolina. The facility opened in October 2012 and is inspired by another karting track located in Parma, Italy.

Images

Motorsports career results

American Open-Wheel series
(key)

Champ Car

NASCAR
(key) (Bold – Pole position awarded by qualifying time. Italics – Pole position earned by points standings or practice time. * – Most laps led.)

Cup Series

Daytona 500

Xfinity Series

Camping World Truck Series

 Season still in progress
 Ineligible for series points

ARCA Re/Max Series
(key) (Bold – Pole position awarded by qualifying time. Italics – Pole position earned by points standings or practice time. * – Most laps led.)

24 Hours of Daytona
(key)

References

External links

 
 

Living people
1984 births
Sportspeople from Glendale, Arizona
Racing drivers from Arizona
Racing drivers from Phoenix, Arizona
24 Hours of Daytona drivers
NASCAR drivers
ARCA Menards Series drivers
Champ Car drivers
Indy Pro 2000 Championship drivers
Rolex Sports Car Series drivers
Michael Waltrip Racing drivers
Joe Gibbs Racing drivers
Team Penske drivers
Richard Childress Racing drivers
Rocketsports Racing drivers
Meyer Shank Racing drivers